The Men's marathon athletics events for the 2012 Summer Paralympics took place at the London Olympic Stadium from 31 August to 8 September. A total of 3 events were contested over this distance for 3 different classifications.

Results

T12

T46

T54

References

Athletics at the 2012 Summer Paralympics
Summer Paralympics
Marathons at the Paralympics
Men's marathons
Marathons in the United Kingdom
2012 in men's athletics